Mr Jones is a 2019 biographical thriller film directed by Agnieszka Holland. It was selected to compete for the Golden Bear at the 69th Berlin International Film Festival. The film loosely tells the story of Gareth Jones, a journalist from Wales, who in 1933 travels to the Soviet Union and uncovers the truth about the Holodomor, the devastating famine in Ukraine in which millions died.

Plot
In 1933, Gareth Jones is an ambitious young journalist who gained some renown for his interview with Adolf Hitler. Thanks to his connections to Lloyd George, the former British prime minister, he can get official permission to travel to the Soviet Union. Jones intends to try to interview Stalin and to find out more about the Soviet Union's economic expansion and its apparently-successful five-year development plan.

Jones is restricted to Moscow but jumps his train and travels unofficially to Ukraine to discover evidence of the Holodomor, including empty villages, starving people, cannibalism and the enforced collection of grain. On his return to Britain, he struggles to get his story taken seriously. The film ends by recording that Jones died while reporting in Inner Mongolia with a guide who was secretly connected to the Soviet secret service.

Cast

Release
The film had its world premiere at the 2019 Berlin International Film Festival. Distribution rights for North America were acquired by Samuel Goldwyn Films in August 2019, and was released in the United Kingdom on 7 February 2020. It was scheduled to be released in the United States on 3 April 2020.

Reception
The website's critics' consensus reads: "Flawed yet fundamentally worthy, Mr. Jones peers into the past to tell a fact-based story that remains troublingly relevant today." On Metacritic, the film has a score of 68 out of 100 based on reviews from 19 critics, indicating "generally favourable reviews".

Kevin Maher of The Times gave the film two out of five, calling it a "bungled biopic of Stalin whistle-blower". Peter Bradshaw of The Guardian gave the film four out of five, calling it "a bold and heartfelt movie with a real Lean-ian sweep". Tim Robey of The Daily Telegraph gave it three out of five, praising Sarsgaard for his performance and for raising the "sadly untapped" potential of the film. Robey criticised the script and concluded, "There's enough in Mr Jones to make you want a good deal more". David Ehrlich at Indiewire gave the film a grade C. Kyle Smith of National Review gave the film a favourable review, noting "To this day, Mr. Jones is all but unknown and his courage is unsung by his inky heirs, whereas Duranty's Pulitzer Prize remains on the books even after a thousand other things have been canceled. Meanwhile, Mr. Jones joins the unconscionably brief list of brutally honest films about Communism."

The film was received poorly by members of Gareth Jones's family, who drew attention to its various distortions and historical inaccuracies, but acknowledged the overall quality of the film. They also accused the filmmakers of taking advantage of their research, assistance, and goodwill. On 20 January 2020, a news story appeared in The Sunday Times entitled "Family fury as film turns daring reporter Gareth Jones into accidental cannibal". This was based on an article written by Jones's great-nephew, Philip Colley, "The True Story behind the 'True Story' of Mr Jones".

Awards
 Grand Prix Golden Lions at the 44th Gdynia Film Festival 2019.

See also
Mass killings under communist regimes

References

External links
 
 
 

2019 films
2010s biographical films
2010s political thriller films
2010s English-language films
English-language Polish films
English-language Ukrainian films
2010s Russian-language films
Ukrainian-language films
Welsh-language films
British biographical drama films
British political drama films
British political thriller films
Cultural depictions of David Lloyd George
Cultural depictions of George Orwell
Films about the Soviet Union in the Stalin era
Films directed by Agnieszka Holland
Films set in the 1930s
Films set in 1933
Films set in London
Films set in Moscow
Films set in Ukraine
Films set in Wales
Films about the Holodomor
Polish biographical films
Polish drama films
Polish thriller films
Polish political films
Drama films based on actual events
Thriller films based on actual events
Political films based on actual events
Ukrainian biographical films
Ukrainian drama films
Ukrainian thriller films
Ukrainian political films
Biographical films about journalists
Cultural depictions of William Randolph Hearst
Polish biographical drama films
2010s British films